Brooklyn Mall is a shopping mall in Brooklyn, Pretoria, South Africa, owned by development company Growthpoint Properties. Brooklyn is designed around two spaces – the Mall itself, hosting the retail area, and Brooklyn Square, an outside dining area.

References

Shopping centres in Pretoria